VIXX 2016 Conception Ker (stylized as VIXX 2016 CONCEPTION Κήρ) is the second compilation album by South Korean boy band VIXX. The special album was released on November 21, 2016 under Jellyfish Entertainment, supported by a music video and a new song. The album contains songs from their two single albums Zelos and Hades and mini-album Kratos. The song "Milky Way" was chosen as the album's title track.

Background and release
Before the release of the special album, this year-long project was divided into three parts under the title of VIXX 2016 CONCEPTION with the keyword Ker (Κήρ) and was conceptualized around the Gods that appear in Greek mythology, it included VIXX's two single albums Zelos; released on April 19, 2016 and Hades; released on August 12, 2016 and their third mini-album Kratos which was released on October 31, 2016. VIXX 2016 CONCEPTION also included concept films, art films and trailers such as the Conception Art Film and VIXX 2016 CONCEPTION OPENING TRAILER to furthermore show the concept for each part of the trilogy including the series itself.

Zelos was the first album in the trilogy, it had three tracks including the title track "Dynamite" and it was based upon the Greek God of Zelos; the Greek God of Jealousy and Rivalry. The second album Hades also had three tracks including the title track “Fantasy" and it was based upon Hades; who was the ancient Greek chthonic god of the underworld. The final album in the trilogy was Kratos and unlike the previous releases Kratos had five tracks including the title track "The Closer" and it was based upon Kratos; the personification of strength, might, sovereign rule, and authority in all its forms.  Each album was packaged in the same way and each album had an accompanying concept film which was released before the music videos and albums themselves.

The trilogy was commercially successful with Zelos and Hades charting at Number 1 and Kratos charting at Number 2 on the Gaon album chart. Zelos sold 110,334 cumulative copies in the months of April and May. Hades sold 103,450 cumulative copies in the months of August and September, and Kratos sold 57,456 cumulative copies in October.

On November 11, 2016, VIXX revealed that they would be releasing a special album to wrap up and celebrate the end of the VIXX 2016 CONCEPTION project. On November 14, VIXX revealed that the special album titled VIXX 2016 CONCEPTION KER (Κήρ) will consist of two discs (CD and DVD), a 92-page 2016 Conception commentary book and 92 page photo book, random poster and bookmark shaped like a key in a special box that doubles as a collectors box for the original trilogy albums Zelos, Hades and Kratos.

On November 15, it was announced that the title song of the special album would be called “Milky Way” which was written by VIXX members Ravi and Hyuk and composed and arranged by Justin Reinstein. The accompanying music video for “Milky Way” was filmed on the 13th of November, it features scenes of 600 fans from VIXX's Official Fanclub ST★RLIGHT at KINTEX in Ilsan, Gyeonggi Province.

Track listing

Chart performance

Release history

References

External links
 VIXX 2016 CONCEPTION KER Special Package on iTunes
 

2016 albums
VIXX albums
Jellyfish Entertainment compilation albums
Stone Music Entertainment albums
Korean-language albums
K-pop compilation albums
Korean-language compilation albums